Wilhelm Marschall (30 September 1886 – 20 March 1976) was a German admiral during World War II. He was also a recipient of the Pour le Mérite which he received as commander of the German U-boat  during World War I. The Pour le Mérite was the Kingdom of Prussias highest military order for German officers until the end of World War I.

Biography
Marschall was born in Augsburg, Kingdom of Bavaria, in 1886. 

In 1906, he entered the Kaiserliche Marine as a Seekadett. He sank 41 merchant ships and two troopships, for a total of 119,170 GRT, and was awarded the Pour la Mérite, Germany's highest military honour.

While in the Reichsmarine, Marschall served primarily as a Vermessungsoffizier (surveying officer) and in different staff positions. At the end of 1934 he became commander of the pocket battleship Admiral Scheer. As a Konteradmiral in 1936, he joined the Naval High Command and headed the operations division. During the Spanish Civil War Marschall commanded the German naval forces off of the Spanish coast. He was promoted to Admiral and Flottenchef (fleet commander) in 1939.

Admiral Marschall, flying his flag in battleship Gneisenau, led the German naval force which intercepted and sank the British auxiliary cruiser  on 23 November 1939, while on patrol off Faroe Islands. 

On 8 June 1940, during the latter part of the Norwegian Campaign, Marschall and part of his force (flagship Gneisenau, and her sister-ship Scharnhorst) fell in with British aircraft carrier  and two destroyers ( and ) about 280 miles west of Harstad, Norway. 
In a two-hour action, Glorious and her accompanying destroyers were all sunk, in exchange for damage to Scharnhorst (struck by one of Acasta's torpedoes, and one shell from each of the destroyers). To this day it is still not known why Marschall abandoned over 1600 Royal Navy sailors from the sinking of the 3 RN ships to their deaths, despite there being no other RN assets in the area.

Although the battle resulted in a German victory, Marschall had engaged Glorious despite orders to avoid action. Marschall's differences with the High Command on this subject, and the severe damage to Scharnhorst during the engagement, ensured that Marschall was replaced as Flottenchef by Admiral Günther Lütjens. Marschall led the inspection of naval education for two years beginning in the summer 1940.

In 1942, Marschall was named commanding admiral of occupied France and replaced Alfred Saalwächter as commander of Marinegruppenkommando West. On 1 February 1943 he was promoted to Generaladmiral, but was replaced as western commander by Theodor Krancke and deactivated later that spring. During the remainder of the war, Marschall was reactivated twice, once as Sonderbevollmächtigter (special agent) for the Danube, and once as commander of the Marineoberkommando West shortly before the end of the war. From 1945–47 he was held as a prisoner of war.

Marschall died in Mölln, West Germany, in 1976.

Awards

Pour le Mérite (4 July 1918)

Clasp to the Iron Cross 2nd and 1st Class
 Iron Cross 2nd and 1st Class
German Cross in Gold (23 March 1942)

References

Citations

Bibliography

1886 births
1976 deaths
Military personnel from Augsburg
People from the Kingdom of Bavaria
Reichsmarine personnel
Imperial German Navy personnel of World War I
General admirals of the Kriegsmarine
U-boat commanders (Imperial German Navy)
Recipients of the Pour le Mérite (military class)
Recipients of the Gold German Cross
Recipients of the Imtiyaz Medal
Recipients of the Liakat Medal
German military personnel of the Spanish Civil War
Recipients of the clasp to the Iron Cross, 1st class
German prisoners of war in World War II